Mulana Mufti Fazli Ghafoor; (born 13 April 1979) is a Pakistani politician hailing from Torwarsak, Daggar, Buner. who was a member of the Khyber Pakhtunkhwa Assembly from 2013 to 2018. Ghafoor belong to the Jamiat Ulema-e-Islam (F). He also served as chairman and member of the different committees

Early life and education
Mufti Fazli ghafoor hold BA degree and also did MA in political science. He also did his religious education and hold sanad of Mufti course.

Personal life
Fazli Ghafoor belong to a religious Pashtun family in Torwarsak Buner. He is the son of great Islamic scholar of Buner Sheikh-ul-Hadees Hazrat Maulana Abdul Wadud دامت برکاتہم

Other names
Sher e Buner 
Mawlawi Sb مولوی صاحب  
Amir  e Muhtaram

Political career
Mufti Fazli Ghafoor was elected as the member of the Khyber Pakhtunkhwa Assembly on ticket of Jamiat Ulema-e-Islam (F) from PK-79 (Buner-III) Now PK-20 (Buner-I)  in 2013 Pakistani general election.

Notable works
Torwarsak bridge is one of his biggest project for Buner, especially for Torwarsak.

References

External links
Telegram
Twitter 

Living people
Pashtun people
Jamiat Ulema-e-Islam (F) politicians
Khyber Pakhtunkhwa MPAs 2013–2018
People from Buner District
1979 births
Jamia Uloom-ul-Islamia alumni
Deobandis